The British Ambassador to Georgia is the United Kingdom's foremost diplomatic representative in Georgia, and head of the UK's diplomatic mission in Tbilisi. The official title is His Britannic Majesty's Ambassador to Georgia.

After the collapse of the Soviet Union, the United Kingdom renewed diplomatic relations with Georgia and the then British ambassador to Russia, Sir Brian Fall, was also accredited to Georgia until the new embassy in Tbilisi was opened in 1995.

Heads of Mission

Chief British Commissioner of Transcaucasus
1919–1920: Sir Oliver Wardrop
1920–1921: Claude Stokes

Ambassadors
1995–1998: Stephen Nash
1998–2001: Richard Jenkins
2001–2004: Deborah Barnes-Jones
2004–2007: Donald MacLaren
2007–2010: Denis Keefe
2010–2013: Judith Gough
2013: David Moran Chargé d'affaires with personal rank of ambassador
2013–2016: Alexandra Hall Hall

2016–2020: Justin McKenzie Smith
2020–: Mark Clayton

References

External links

UK and Georgia, gov.uk

Georgia
 
United Kingdom